Jeanuël Belocian (born 17 February 2005) is a French professional footballer who plays as a centre-back or central midfielder for Ligue 1 club Rennes.

Club career 
Born and raised in Guadeloupe, Belocian joined the youth association of AJC at age 5 before joining Stade Lamentinois at age 8. Belocian joined the youth academy of Rennes in July 2020 and signed his first professional contract with the club on 10 November 2021, with the contract running until 2024.

Jeanuël Belocian made his professional debut for Rennes on the 20 March 2022, replacing Nayef Aguerd at the 79th minute of a 6–1 home Ligue 1 win to Metz.

Personal life 
Jeanuël is the younger brother of Wilhem Belocian, a French Olympic hurdler and sprinter.

Honours
France U17
UEFA European Under-17 Championship: 2022

References

External links

2005 births
Living people
People from Les Abymes
French footballers
Guadeloupean footballers
Association football defenders
France youth international footballers
Ligue 1 players
Championnat National 2 players
Championnat National 3 players
Stade Rennais F.C. players